The Laurence Olivier Award for Actress of the Year in a New Play was an annual award presented by the Society of London Theatre in recognition of achievements in commercial London theatre. The awards were established as the Society of West End Theatre Awards in 1976, and renamed in 1984 in honour of English actor and director Laurence Olivier.

This award was presented from 1976 to 1984, then in 1985 the award was combined with the Actress of the Year in a Revival award to create the Best Actress award. The original Actress of the Year in a New Play award returned one last time, for the 1988 ceremony.

Winners and nominees

1970s

1980s

See also
 Drama Desk Award for Outstanding Actress in a Play
 Tony Award for Best Actress in a Play

References

External links
 

Actress
Theatre acting awards
Awards for actresses